The 1881 Kentucky State College football team represented Kentucky State College—now known as the University of Kentucky—during the 1881 college football season. The team compiled a record of 1–2.

Schedule

References

Kentucky State College
Kentucky Wildcats football seasons
Kentucky State College football